Figure skating at the 2001 Goodwill Games took place from 4 to 9 September 2001 at the Brisbane Entertainment Centre in Brisbane, Australia. Medals were awarded in men's singles, ladies' singles, pair skating, and ice dancing.

Schedule

Results

Men
Plushenko performed three quadruple jumps in his winning performance. Yagudin crashed into the boards in his short program.

Ladies

 WD = Withdrew

Pairs

Ice dancing

References

External links
 2001 Goodwill Games at the International Skating Union
 Detailed results at the GoodwillGames.com

2001 in figure skating
International figure skating competitions hosted by Australia
Figure skating
2001